Salah Amin (born 18 September 1981) is an Egyptian professional footballer who plays as a forward for Egyptian Premier League club Misr Lel Makkasa and the Egypt national team.

References

1981 births
Living people
Egyptian footballers
Egypt international footballers
Egyptian Premier League players
Association football forwards
El Qanah FC players
Ismaily SC players
El Dakhleya SC players
Tala'ea El Gaish SC players
Smouha SC players
El Entag El Harby SC players
Nogoom FC players